Anna Godbersen (born April 10, 1980) is an American writer. She is the author of the series The Luxe, with The Luxe, the first book in the series, being her debut novel. The first book in her new series, Bright Young Things, was released on October 12, 2010.

Personal life
Anna Godbersen was born in Berkeley, California, in 1980. She attended Berkeley High School in Berkeley, California. She was educated at Barnard College in Manhattan, and currently lives in Brooklyn, New York. One of her heroes is her mother, Suzanne Lacke.

Bibliography

The Luxe
 The Luxe (November 20, 2007)
 Rumors (June 3, 2008)
 Envy (January 27, 2009)
 Splendor (October 27, 2009)

Bright Young Things
 Bright Young Things (October 12, 2010)
 Beautiful Days (September 20, 2011)
 The Lucky Ones (November 27, 2012)

Other works
 "The Blonde" (2014)

References

External links
 The Luxe/Bright Young Things Official Book Site
 Harper Teen's The Luxe Site
 Anna Godbersen's Profile on Harper Teen
 Bright, Young, & Luxe
 Anna Godbersen's MySpace

1980 births
Living people
Writers from Berkeley, California
Barnard College alumni
People from Brooklyn
Berkeley High School (Berkeley, California) alumni